Gregory N. Washington is an American university professor and academic administrator. On July 1, 2020, he became the 8th president of George Mason University. Prior to becoming a university president, he was the Stacey Nicholas Dean of Engineering in the Henry Samueli School of Engineering at the University of California, Irvine from 2011 to 2020. He was the first African-American person to be made dean of an engineering school in the University of California system. His research considers dynamical systems, smart materials and devices.

Early life and education 
Washington was born in New York City. He attended William G. Enloe High School in Raleigh, North Carolina, graduating in 1984. Washington studied mechanical engineering at North Carolina State University. He earned his bachelor's degree in 1989 and his doctoral degree in 1994. In the early 1990s he assisted in creating The Nubian Message, an African-American student newspaper. He was the first person in his family to obtain a university degree.

Research and career 
In 1995 Washington joined Ohio State University as an assistant professor of mechanical engineering. He was promoted to associate professor in 2000 and professor in 2004. At Ohio State University, he led the Institute for Sustainable Energy and the Environment, He assumed the role of associate dean for research in the college of engineering in 2005, and in 2008, was promoted to interim dean of the college of engineering. He has been involved with the design of lightweight, structurally active antenna, self-driving vehicles and smart materials that can provide vibrational control.

In 2011 Washington was appointed Dean of the Henry Samueli School of Engineering at the University of California, Irvine (UCI). He was the first African-American to be made of dean of any engineering school in the University of California system. In his capacity as dean Washington has expanded the engineering school and created research opportunities with the Middle East and China. He design an engineering induction program that introduced freshmen to product design.

In 2015 he chaired the UCI Task Force on Ensuring Positive Campus Climate for the African American community. The task force was established after the UCI Black Students Union sent a letter outlining the "structural deficiencies in institutional support for Black students on this campus". The task force looked to establish a Black Resource Center, similar to the BRC at the University of California, San Diego, which looks to help with the recruitment and retention of students who identify as part of the Black African diaspora. The center has since become the Center for Black Cultures, Resources & Research. Washington secured a $9.5 million grant to engage students from more diverse backgrounds through science and engineering outreach. He was awarded a second term in 2016.

On February 24, 2020, Washington was announced as the 8th president of George Mason University in Fairfax, Virginia. Effective July 1 of that year, at the height of the global COVID-19 pandemic, Washington became the University's first African-American president. He led the university during the pandemic and launched the university-wide task force on anti-racism and inclusive excellence to identify and correct inequities in university policies and practices.

Washington serves on the Air Force Research Laboratory and National Science Foundation Directorate for Engineering Advisory Committees.

References 

Living people
Year of birth missing (living people)
Engineers from New York City
Engineers from North Carolina
African-American engineers
North Carolina State University alumni
Ohio State University faculty
University of California, Irvine faculty
William G. Enloe High School alumni
Presidents of George Mason University
21st-century African-American people